Samuel D. Margolis (November 1, 1923 – March 27, 1996) was an American jazz reedist.

Career 
Margolis played locally in the Boston area early in his career, with Shad Collins, Vic Dickenson, Bobby Hackett, Nat Pierce, and Rex Stewart. He worked extensively with Ruby Braff between 1954 and 1958, both under Braff's own name and as sidemen for other musicians, including Pee Wee Russell. He would continue working intermittently with Braff for several decades. In 1970, he also appeared briefly in the parade scene in the Dick Van Dyke movie "Some Kind of a Nut" Throughout the 1970s and 1980s, he played often in the New York area, with Ed Polcer, Buzzy Drootin, Max Kaminsky, Roy Eldridge, Tony Bennet, Claude Hopkins, Dill Jones, Vic Dickenson again, and Red Balaban.

Personal life 
Near the end of his life, he moved to Deerfield Beach, Florida, where he died of prostate cancer in 1996.

References
"Sam Margolis". The New Grove Dictionary of Jazz. 2nd edition, ed. Barry Kernfeld.
"Sam Margolis". The Encyclopedia of Jazz. New edition Leonard Feather

American jazz saxophonists
American male saxophonists
American jazz clarinetists
Musicians from Boston
1923 births
1996 deaths
20th-century American saxophonists
Jazz musicians from Massachusetts
20th-century American male musicians
American male jazz musicians